KOMB (103.9 FM) is a radio station broadcasting a classic hits format. Licensed to Fort Scott, Kansas, United States, it serves the Pittsburg area. The station is currently owned by Fort Scott Broadcasting Co., Inc..

External links

OMB
Classic hits radio stations in the United States
Radio stations established in 1971
Bourbon County, Kansas